Navin Neil Vanu (born Navin Nigel Vanu, 11 August 1989) is a Singaporean footballer who last played as a striker for Woodlands Wellington FC. Apart from playing as a forward, he can also operate effectively as a winger.

Club career
Having played for Geylang United and Woodlands Wellington in his youth, Neil was promoted to the senior squad of the Rams in 2010, where he made 28 appearances for the northern side in his maiden season with the senior squad. His speed and nifty footwork were soon noticed by Slobodan Pavković, the coach of the Singapore Under-23 squad and he was soon drafted into the Young Lions in the midst of the 2011 season in preparation for the 2011 Southeast Asian Games held in Indonesia later that year. However, his appearances were limited as he found it hard to break through the squad.

In June 2012, it was announced that Neil Vanu would return to his former club, Woodlands Wellington, during the mid-season transfer window and will be assigned the number 34 jersey.

On 21 June 2012, Neil made his re-debut for Woodlands in a match against Geylang United.

On 23 November 2012, it was announced by Woodlands Wellington that he would not be retained for the 2013 season.

Club career statistics

Navin Neil Vanu's Profile

All numbers encased in brackets signify substitute appearances.

International career

Neil is probably most remembered for being sent off in the Singapore Under-23 team's SEA Games Group A match against Indonesia. He got a red card in the 23rd minute of the match after picking up his second yellow for hitting an Indonesian player while they were tussling for the ball. He has since apologised publicly for the incident.

Neil also left a huge impression by coming on as a substitute against Cambodia and scoring the winner in the 74th minute of the match with a firm header off Yasir Hanapi's cross.

International appearances for U23 teams

International goals

References

1989 births
Living people
Singaporean footballers
Woodlands Wellington FC players
Singapore Premier League players
Singaporean people of Tamil descent
Singaporean sportspeople of Indian descent
Association football forwards
Young Lions FC players